Corinne is an unincorporated community in Bratt's Lake Rural Municipality No. 129, Saskatchewan, Canada.

See also
 List of communities in Saskatchewan

References

Bratt's Lake No. 129, Saskatchewan
Unincorporated communities in Saskatchewan
Division No. 6, Saskatchewan